Al Fayha FC is a professional football club based in Al Majma'ah, that plays in the Saudi Professional League, the first tier of Saudi Football. It was founded in 1953.

Al Fayha's colors are orange and blue, hence the nickname "Al-Burtuqali." Al-Fayha have won the Saudi Second Division once in the 2013–14 season and have finished runners-up once in the 2003–04. On 29 April 2017, Al-Feiha won their first promotion to the Pro League and on 5 May 2017 won their first ever First Division title. And They only won the King Cup Once.

The club plays their home games at King Salman Sport City Stadium in Al Majma'ah, sharing the stadium with city rivals Al-Faisaly and Al-Mujazzel.

History

Al Fayha was founded in 1953 in Al Majma'ah and were officially registered on August 15, 1966. Al Fayha is one of the oldest clubs in the country and the oldest club in Al Majma'ah. Al Fayha is a merging of two different clubs, Minikh and Al-Fayha, who joined to become the only representative of Al Majma'ah.

Since the formation of the club, Al Fayha has played a continuous role in the service of the youth in Al-Majma'ah. Al Fayha is considered to be one of the most active and interactive clubs in the city, often acting as a safe haven for the youth.

Al Fayha won their first-ever promotion to the First Division in 1985 and spent five consecutive seasons in the First Division before getting relegated at the end of the 1989–90 season. After an absence of 14 years, Al-Fayha returned to the First Division after finishing as runners-up in the 2003–04 Second Division. Al Fayha spent 4 consecutive seasons in the First Division before getting relegated at the end of the 2007–08 season. They were then promoted once again during the 2013–14 season when they won the Second Division title. On 29 April 2017, Al-Fayha won promotion to the Pro League for the first time in their history following their 2–1 home win against Ohod. They were crowned champions of the 2016–17 Saudi First Division for the first time on 5 May 2017 after drawing Wej 1–1 away from home.

Al-Fayha spent three consecutive seasons in the Saudi top flight, performing above expectations in their debut season and barely escaping relegation in their second season, however they couldn't avoid relegation in the 2019–20 season, losing 0-1 to Al-Taawoun in the final matchday. In their first season back in the Saudi First Division Al-Fayha managed to achieve promotion back to the top flight following a 0–0 home draw with Al-Tai on the 20th of May 2021, as well as finishing the season as runners-up with 81 points. In their first season back in the Pro League Al Fayha acquired the services of players such as; veteran Serbian goalkeeper Vladimir Stojković, Greek midfielder Panagiotis Tachtsidis and Macedonian international Aleksandar Trajkovski. Vuk Rašović managed his squad with a direct play approach along with disciplined organisation, and as a result the club has had the best defensive record in the 2021-22 league.

Al-Fayha partook in the 2021–22 King Cup, with their first match being against Abha whom they routed 4-0 to progress to the quarter-finals. In the quarter-final they faced Al-Batin, whom they beat 2-1. In the semi-final they were up against Al-Ittihad in a highly contested and hard fought match in which Al-Fayha came up on top to win 1-0 and advance to a historic first cup final. Al-Fayha would face Al-Hilal in the final. The two sides were locked at 1-1 after extra time with Al Fayha prevailing in the penalty shootout thanks to a superb performance from their Serbian goalkeeper Vladimir Stojkovic to clinch their maiden Saudi King’s Cup at the King Abdullah Sports City Stadium. In doing so, Al-Fayha qualified for the 2023–24 AFC Champions League qualifying play-offs.

Honours
Saudi First Division
Winners (1): 2016–17
Runners-up (1): 2020–21

Saudi Second Division
Winners (2): 1984–85, 2013–14
Runners-up (1): 2003–04 
King Cup
Winners (1): 2021–22

Current squad

As of 24 July 2021:

Managerial history
 Youssef Baati (2001 – 2002)
 Habibe Othmani (August 1, 2002 – November 2, 2002)
 Hassan Oueslati (November 2, 2002 – May 1, 2003)
 Rasheed Ben Ammar (August 1, 2003 – June 6, 2004)
 Lula (October 11, 2004 – April 23, 2005)
 Ali Komaikh (April 23, 2005 – May 18, 2005)
 Turki Al-Sultan (caretaker) (May 18, 2005 – June 1, 2005)
 Zouhair Louati (June 25, 2005 – March 10, 2006)
 Ibrahim Al-Qarmalah (caretaker) (March 10, 2006 – May 1, 2006)
 Hichem Grioui (July 14, 2006 – November 25, 2006)
 Ibrahim Al-Qarmalah (caretaker) (November 25, 2006 – December 17, 2006)
 Zouhair Louati (December 17, 2006 – May 10, 2007)
 Ghazi Ghrairi (July 30, 2007 – February 19, 2008)
 Bahaaeddine Qebisi (February 19, 2008 – April 27, 2008)
 Zouhair Ghodbani (April 27, 2008 – April 30, 2008)
 Hamdan Al-Jara'ah (caretaker) (April 30, 2008 – May 17, 2008)
 Nasser Nefzi (July 1, 2008 – January 13, 2009)
 Ibrahim Al-Qarmalah (January 13, 2009 – March 23, 2009)
 Mohammed Farouk (March 23, 2009 – October 18, 2009)
 Selim Al Manga (October 20, 2009 – May 10, 2010)
 Yousri bin Kahla (July 1, 2010 – December 5, 2010)
 Selim bin Gholis (caretaker) (December 5, 2010 – December 11, 2010)
 Selim Al Manga (December 11, 2010 – May 10, 2011)
 Mohammed Farouk (July 1, 2011 – December 1, 2011)
 Ibrahim Al-Qarmalah (caretaker) (December 1, 2011 – December 17, 2011)
 Moncef Mcharek (December 17, 2011 – April 17, 2013)
 Rateb Al-Awadat (April 17, 2013 – August 21, 2013)
 Makram Abdullah (August 23, 2013 – May 1, 2014)
 Ahmed Labyad (May 7, 2014 – November 12, 2014)
 Abderrazek Chebbi (November 13, 2014 – May 1, 2015)
 Khalil Al-Masri (June 9, 2015 – September 20, 2015)
 Lassaad Maamar (September 28, 2015 – May 2, 2016)
 Habib Ben Romdhane (May 2, 2016 – May 10, 2017)
 Constantin Gâlcă (May 20, 2017 – November 1, 2017)
 Gustavo Costas (November 1, 2017 – October 15, 2018)
 Slavoljub Muslin (October 15, 2018 – February 2, 2019)
 Noureddine Zekri (February 5, 2019 – May 17, 2019)
 Jorge Simão (June 8, 2019 – August 27, 2020)
 Yousef Al-Ghadeer (August 27, 2020 – September 10, 2020)
 Habib Ben Romdhane (September 24, 2020 – June 1, 2021)
 Vuk Rašović (June 21, 2021 – )

References

External links
 Official Website
 Official Twitter

 
Football clubs in Saudi Arabia
Association football clubs established in 1953
Football clubs in Al Majma'ah
1953 establishments in Saudi Arabia